Meril-Prothom Alo Critics Award for Best Film is an award presented annually by the Meril-Prothom Alo since 2003, a part of Meril-Prothom Alo Awards.

Winners and nominees

2000s

2010s

References

External links

Best Film
Awards for best film